Mantovani Plays Music from Exodus and Other Great Themes is an album by Mantovani and His Orchestra. It was released in 1960 by London (catalog no. LL-3231). It debuted on Billboard magazine's pop album chart on December 5, 1960, held the No. 2 spot for five weeks, and remained on the chart for 44 weeks. It was an RIAA certified gold album (minimum 500,000 units sold). AllMusic later gave the album a rating of four-and-a-half stars.

Track listing
Side A
 "Exodus"
 "Karen"
 "A Summer Place"
 "The Green Leaves of Summer"
 "Song Without End"
 "Seventy-Six Trombones"

Side B
 "The Sundowners"
 "Irma La Douce"
 "I Love Paris"
 "Mr. Wonderful"
 "The Carousel Waltz"
 "The Sound of Music"

References

1960 albums
London Records albums
Mantovani albums